Peter J. Durant is an American politician who represents the 6th Worcester District in the Massachusetts House of Representatives and is a former member of the Spencer, Massachusetts Board of Selectmen.

2010 election and 2011 special election
The 2010 election for the 6th Worcester seat resulted in an exact tie between Durant and Democratic incumbent Geraldo Alicea. A special election for the seat was scheduled for May 10, 2011. Alicea was allowed to hold the seat until the results of the new election.

Durant won the special election by 56 votes (3,325 votes to Alicea's 3,269).

See also
 2019–2020 Massachusetts legislature
 2021–2022 Massachusetts legislature

References

Republican Party members of the Massachusetts House of Representatives
People from Spencer, Massachusetts
Northeastern University alumni
Florida Institute of Technology alumni
Living people
Massachusetts local politicians
Year of birth missing (living people)
21st-century American politicians